William Warren Lowe (12 October 1831 - 18 May 1898) led a volunteer regiment of cavalry from Iowa in the Union Army during the American Civil War. He graduated from the United States Military Academy in 1853. He served as a cavalry officer on the frontier in Texas in 1855–1861. When the Civil War broke out, Lowe fought at First Bull Run. He organized the 5th Iowa Cavalry Regiment and led it at Corinth, at Riggins Hill, the Tullahoma campaign, in Wheeler's October 1863 Raid, the Atlanta campaign, and the Franklin–Nashville Campaign. On several occasions he temporarily led a cavalry brigade and was brevetted brigadier general for war service. He resigned from the army in 1869 and took up civilian pursuits.

See also
List of American Civil War brevet generals (Union)

References

1831 births
1898 deaths
People of Indiana in the American Civil War
Union Army colonels
United States Army officers
United States Military Academy alumni